Frum is a word that describes Jewish religious devotion. 

The term connotes the observance of Jewish religious law in a way that often exceeds its bare requirements. This not only includes the careful study of Torah, daily prayers, observing Shabbat and kashrut, and performing deeds of loving-kindness, but also many more customs and khumrot (prohibitions or obligations in Jewish life that exceed the requirements of Halakha).

The term frum contrasts with frei, which describes Jews who are secular or practice non-Orthodox observance, or "free from keeping the… commandments."

Meaning
Frum can be used in a negative sense for 'hypocritically pious', 'holier-than-thou', 'sanctimonious'; or in a positive sense for 'pious', 'devout', 'God-fearing', and 'upright'. The phrase frum and ehrlich captures the positive connotations of these words, to mean roughly 'upright' or 'righteous' (see tzadik).

The question "is s/he frum?" asks whether the person is religious.

Derived terms
In Yinglish, frummer is used both as a noun for 'one who is frum', and as a comparative adjective, i.e. 'more frum'. The prescribed Yiddish comparative form of the adjective is, in fact, . Frumkeit describes the lifestyle of those who are frum.

Frummer can also have a negative connotation, similar to chasid shoteh ('pious idiot'), which is how the Talmud (Sotah 21B) describes a man who sees a woman drowning, but refuses to save her, and says, "It is not proper to look at her, and rescue her." A frummer in that sense is a person displaying a disproportionate emphasis on technical aspects of religion of one's daily life in a manner which actually violates the halakha in a specific case. (See Pikuach nefesh.) Another term with this meaning is frummie.

A person who is frum from birth (or "FFB") was born into a frum household and has remained observant. This contrasts with a baal teshuva (literally 'master of return') (or "BT"), a Jew who has become frum after a period or lifetime living a non-Orthodox lifestyle.

The Frumba exercise program originated in Chicago as a derivation of the dance based fitness program Zumba. Frumba classes are offered exclusively to women who observe frum forms of tzniut modesty laws, featuring music with less explicit lyrics.

Mode of dress

The New York Times defines the word frum as 'religiously observant'. For boys and men, covering the head is an identifier of religiosity. For women, being frum includes adherence to the laws of tzniut, such as modest dress covering the arms and legs. For married women, a head covering is another indicator.

See also
 Frum (surname)
 Off the derech

References

Orthodox Judaism
Yiddish words and phrases